Ichthyoplankton (from Greek: ἰχθύς, "fish"; and πλαγκτός, "drifter") are the eggs and larvae of fish. They are mostly found in the sunlit zone of the water column, less than 200 metres deep, which is sometimes called the epipelagic or photic zone. Ichthyoplankton are planktonic, meaning they cannot swim effectively under their own power, but must drift with the ocean currents. Fish eggs cannot swim at all, and are unambiguously planktonic. Early stage larvae swim poorly, but later stage larvae swim better and cease to be planktonic as they grow into juveniles. Fish larvae are part of the zooplankton that eat smaller plankton, while fish eggs carry their own food supply. Both eggs and larvae are themselves eaten by larger animals.

Fish can produce high numbers of eggs which are often released into the open water column. The newly hatched young of oviparous fish are called larvae. They are usually poorly formed, carry a large yolk sac (for nourishment) and are very different in appearance from juvenile and adult specimens. The larval period in oviparous fish is relatively short (usually only several weeks), and larvae rapidly grow and change appearance and structure (a process termed metamorphosis) to become juveniles. During this transition larvae  must switch from their yolk sac to feeding on zooplankton prey, a process which depends on typically inadequate zooplankton density, starving many larvae.

Ichthyoplankton can be a useful indicator of the state and health of an aquatic ecosystem. For instance, most late stage larvae in ichthyoplankton have usually been preyed on, so ichthyoplankton tends to be dominated by eggs and early stage larvae. This means that when fish, such as anchovies and sardines, are spawning, ichthyoplankton samples can reflect their spawning output and provide an
index of relative population size for the fish. Increases or decreases in the number of adult fish stocks can be detected more rapidly and sensitively by monitoring the ichthyoplankton associated with them, compared to monitoring the adults themselves. It is also usually easier and more cost effective to sample trends in egg and larva populations than to sample trends in adult fish populations.

History
Interest in plankton originated in Britain and Germany in the nineteenth century when researchers discovered there were microorganisms in the sea, and that they could trap them with fine-mesh nets. They started describing these microorganisms and testing different net configurations. Ichthyoplankton research started in 1864 when the Norwegian government commissioned the marine biologist G. O. Sars to investigate fisheries around the Norwegian coast. Sars found fish eggs, particularly cod eggs, drifting in the water. This established that fish eggs could be pelagic, living in the open water column like other plankton. Around the beginning of the twentieth century, research interest in ichthyoplankton became more general when it emerged that, if ichthyoplankton was sampled quantitatively, then the samples could indicate the relative size or abundance of spawning fish stocks.

Sampling methods

Research vessels collect ichthyoplankton from the ocean using fine mesh nets. The vessels either tow the nets through the sea or pump sea water onboard and then pass it through the net.

 There are many types of plankton tows:
 Neuston net tows are often made at or just below the surface using a nylon mesh net fitted to a rectangular frame
 The PairoVET tow, used for collecting fish eggs, drops a net about 70 metres into the sea from a stationary research vessel and then drags it back to the vessel.
 Ring net tows involve a nylon mesh net fitted to a circular frame. These have largely been replaced by bongo nets, which provide duplicate samples with their dual-net design.
 The bongo tow drags nets shaped like bongo drums from a moving vessel. The net is often lowered to about 200 metres and then allowed to rise to the surface as it is towed. In this way, a sample can be collected across the whole photic zone where most ichthyoplankton is found.
 MOCNESS tows and Tucker trawls utilize multiple nets that are mechanically opened and closed at discrete depths in order to provide insights into the vertical distribution of the plankton
 The manta trawl tows a net from a moving vessel along the surface of the water, collecting larvae, such as grunion, mahi-mahi, and flying fish which live at the surface.

After the tow the plankton is flushed with a hose to the cod end (bottom) of the net for collection. The sample is then placed in preservative fluid prior to being sorted and identified in a laboratory.

 Plankton pumps: Another method of collecting ichthyoplankton is to use a Continuous Underway Fish Egg Sampler (see illustration). Water from a depth of about three metres is pumped onto the vessel and filtered with a net. This method can be used while the vessel is underway.

Developmental stages
Ichthyoplankton researchers generally use the terminology and development stages introduced in 1984 by Kendall and others. This consists of three main developmental stages and two transitional stages.

Skin ionocytes

Ionocytes (formerly known as mitochondrion-rich cells or as chloride cells) are responsible for maintaining optimal osmotic, ionic, and acid-base levels within the fish. Ionocytes are typically found within adult gills. However, embryonic and larval fishes often lack or have underdeveloped gills. Instead, ionocytes are found along the skin, yolk sac, and fins of the larva. As growth progresses and the gill becomes more developed, ionocytes can be found on the gill arch and gill filament. In larval fishes, the number, size, and density of ionocytes can be quantified as a relative ionocyte area, which has been proposed as a proxy for osmotic, ionic, and/or acid-base capacity of the organism. Ionocytes are also known to be plastic. Ionocyte's apical openings can widen during periods of high activity, and new ionocytes can develop along the gill lamellae during periods of environmental stress. Due to the abundant presence of Na+/K+-ATPase in the basolateral membrane, ionocytes can often be located using immunohistochemistry.

Survival

Recruitment of fish is regulated by larval fish survival. Survival is regulated by prey abundance, predation, and hydrology. Fish eggs and larvae are eaten by many marine organisms. For example, they may be fed upon by marine invertebrates, such as copepods, arrow worms, jellyfish, amphipods, marine snails and  krill. Because they are so abundant, marine invertebrates inflict high overall mortality rates. Adult fish also prey on fish eggs and larvae. For example, haddock were observed satiating themselves with herring eggs back in 1922. Another study found cod in a herring spawning area with 20,000 herring eggs in their stomachs, and concluded that they could prey on half of the total egg production. Fish also cannibalise their own eggs. For example, separate studies found northern anchovy (Engraulis mordax) were responsible for 28% of the mortality in their own egg population, while Peruvian anchoveta were responsible for 10% and South African anchovy (Engraulis encrasicolus) 70%.

The most effective predators are about ten times as long as the larvae they prey on. This is true regardless of whether the predator is a crustacean, a jellyfish, or a fish.

Dispersal

Fish larvae develop first an ability to swim up and down the water column for short distances. Later they develop an ability to swim horizontally for much longer distances. These swimming developments affect their dispersal.

In 2010, a group of scientists reported that fish larvae can drift on ocean currents and reseed fish stocks at a distant location. This finding demonstrates, for the first time, what scientists have long suspected but have never proven, that fish populations can be connected to distant populations through the process of larval drift.

The fish they chose to investigate was the yellow tang, because when a larva of this fish find a suitable reef it stays in the general area for the rest of its life. Thus, it is only as drifting larvae that the fish can migrate significant distances from where they are born. The tropical yellow tang is much sought after by the aquarium trade. By the late 1990s, their stocks were collapsing, so in an attempt to save them nine marine protected areas (MPAs) were established off the coast of Hawaii. Now, through the process of larval drift, fish from the MPAs are establishing themselves in different locations, and the fishery is recovering. "We've clearly shown that fish larvae that were spawned inside marine reserves can drift with currents and replenish fished areas long distances away," said one of the authors, the marine biologist Mark Hixon. "This is a direct observation, not just a model, that successful marine reserves can sustain fisheries beyond their borders."

Gallery

See also

 CalCOFI
 Continuous Plankton Recorder
 Crustacean larvae
 Egg case
 Embryo
 LarvalBase – an online database for ichthyoplankton 
 Marine larval ecology
 Milt
 Salmon run
 Spawning bed
 Spawning trigger
 Stable ocean hypothesis
 Video plankton recorder

Notes

References
 Ahlstrom, Elbert H. and  Moser, H. Geoffrey (1976) "Eggs and larvae of fishes and their role in systematic investigations in fisheries" Revue des Travaux de l'Institut des Pêches Maritimes, 40(3-4): 379–398.
 Balon, Eugene K. (1990) "Epigenesis of an epigeneticist: the development of some alternative concepts on the early ontogeny and evolution of fishes Guelph Ichthyology Reviews, 1: 1–48. 
 Blaber, Stephen J. M. (2000) Tropical estuarine fishes: ecology, exploitation and conservation John Wiley and Sons, Page 153–156. .
 Browman, Howard I. and Skiftesvik, Anne Berit (2003) The Big Fish Bang: Proceedings of the 26th Annual Larval Fish Conference Institute of Marine Research. .
 Finn, Roderick Nigel and Kapoor, B. G. (2008) Fish larval physiology Science Publishers..
 Cowan, J.H., Jr. and R.F. Shaw (2002) "Recruitment" Chap. 4. pp. 88–111. In: L.A. Fuiman and R.G. Werner (eds.) Fishery Science: The unique contributions of early life stages, John Wiley and Sons. .+
 Chambers RC and Trippel EA (1997) Early life history and recruitment in fish population Springer. .
 Houde ED (2010) "Fish Larvae" Page 286–295. In: JH Steele, SA Thorpe and KK Turekian, Marine Biology, Academic Press. .
 Kendall Jr., Arthur W. (2011) Identification of Eggs and Larvae of Marine Fishes 東海大学出版会, 2011. .
 Miller, Bruce S. and Kendall, Arthur W. (2009) Early life history of marine fishes University of California Press. .
 Miller TJ (2002) "Assemblages, Communities, and Species Interactions" Pages 183–205. In: Lee A. Fuiman and Robert G. Werner, Fishery science: the unique contributions of early life stages, John Wiley and Sons. .
 Ichthyoplankton Information System Alaska Fisheries Center, NOAA.
 Early life history section American  Fisheries Society.
 Larval Fish Laboratory Colorado State University.
 Recent advances in the study of fish eggs and larvae  Sci. Mar., 70S2: 2006.
 Guides and keys to larval and early juvenile fishes Warner College of Natural Resources, Colorado State University.

External links

 Ichthyoplankton Survey Methodology Presentation by Yoshinobu Konishi, SEAFDEC-MFRDMD.
 Salmon Eggs Hatching at the Seymour Hatchery Youtube video.

Aquatic ecology
Biological oceanography
Fish reproduction
Ichthyology
Planktology